Dean Odlum (born in Newtown, County Wicklow) is an Irish sportsperson. He plays Gaelic football with his local club Newtown and has been a member of the Wicklow senior inter-county team since 2007.

References

External links
 

Year of birth missing (living people)
Living people
Wicklow inter-county Gaelic footballers